Borovaya Pustosh is a rural locality (a village) in Morozovskoye Rural Settlement, Verkhovazhsky District, Vologda Oblast, Russia. The population was 18 as of 2002.

Geography 
Borovaya Pustosh is located 28 km northwest of Verkhovazhye (the district's administrative centre) by road. Sboyevskaya is the nearest rural locality.

References 

Rural localities in Verkhovazhsky District